Lists of Bundestag Members include:
 List of members of the 1st Bundestag
 List of members of the 2nd Bundestag
 List of members of the 3rd Bundestag
 List of members of the 4th Bundestag
 List of members of the 5th Bundestag
 List of members of the 6th Bundestag
 List of members of the 7th Bundestag
 List of members of the 8th Bundestag
 List of members of the 9th Bundestag
 List of members of the 10th Bundestag
 List of members of the 11th Bundestag
 List of members of the 12th Bundestag
 List of members of the 13th Bundestag
 List of members of the 14th Bundestag
 List of members of the 15th Bundestag
 List of members of the 16th Bundestag
 List of members of the 17th Bundestag
 List of members of the 18th Bundestag
 List of members of the 19th Bundestag
 List of members of the 20th Bundestag

Lists of members of the Bundestag
Bundestag